The Black Republican cherry is a cultivar of cherry. While it is a hybrid, its parentage is not known; it is possibly a cross of the Napoleon and Black Tartarian cultivars, but has also been described as a seedling of the Eagle variety. One of the parents of the Bing cherry, the Black Republican was first grown in the U.S. state of Oregon about 1860 by the horticulturist Seth Lewelling, who gave it its name as a reflection of his Abolitionist beliefs.

The fruit of the Black Republican is small, firm, and deep purple in color, with an intense taste well-suited to preserving. It was a very important commercial cherry in the Pacific Northwest, but already by the early 20th century was being surpassed by the Bing cherry. Today it is a rare variety, with about 200 acres in production, and is listed as an endangered heritage food in the Ark of Taste.

References 

Cherry cultivars
Agriculture in Oregon